Harry J. Smith (9 July 1916 – 25 February 1983) was a former Australian rules footballer who played with Richmond in the Victorian Football League (VFL).

References

External links 		
		

1916 births
1983 deaths
Australian rules footballers from Victoria (Australia)
Richmond Football Club players
Ormond Amateur Football Club players